Ia Pa is a district (huyện) of Gia Lai province in the Central Highlands region of Vietnam.

As of 2003 the district had a population of 44,119. The district covers an area of 871 km², and the capital lies at Kim Tân.

References

Districts of Gia Lai province